The Star Spangles are a four-piece punk band from Manhattan, led by vocalist Ian Wilson. Formed in 1998, they released a single on Spain's Muenster Records in 2000 followed by an album called Bazooka!!! in 2003, which includes the single "Which of the Two of Us is Gonna Burn This House Down?".

After a falling-out with Capitol Records, followed by a line-up change in 2006; the Spangles released their follow up album, Dirty Bomb, in 2007.

The group dissolved in early 2008, but started playing live again in 2015.

Members
The Star Spangles are:
Ian Wilson – lead vocals, rhythm guitar
Tommy Volume – lead guitar, backing vocals
Joey Valentine – drums, backing vocals

The line-up was:
Ian Wilson – lead vocals, rhythm guitar
Nick Price – bass, backing vocals
Joey Valentine – drums, backing vocals
Tommy Volume – Lead guitar, backing vocals

Albums

Bazooka!!!
Release Date: December 10, 2003
UK Chart:
Produced by
CD:
"I Live for the Speed"
"Which of the Two of Us is Gonna Burn This House Down?"
"Angela"
"I Don't Wanna Be Crazy Anymore"
"Stay Away from Me"
"I'll Get Her Back"
"L.A."
"Science Fiction/Science Fact"
"If We Can't Be Lovers"
"In Love Again"
"Crime of the Century"
"Stain Glass Shoes"
"The Party"

Dirty Bomb
Release Date: 2007
Produced by
CD (TR001):
"Take Care Of Us"
"Tear It To Pieces Girl"
"Make Yourself Useful, Babe"
"This Side Of The Sun"
"Gangland"
"I'm On A High"
"Gimme An Answer"
"Tell Lies"
"'Nother Weight To Hold Me Down"
"Revolver"
"I Told A Lie"
"Bash Your Brains Out"
"Someone In You"

Singles

The Star Spangles
Release Date: 2000
UK Chart: N/A
Notes: These are earlier, different recordings from those on Bazooka!!!
7" (7137):
"I Can't Be With You"
"Get You Back"
"The Party"
"Science Fiction/Science Fact"

Which Of The Two Of Us Is Gonna Burn This House Down?
Release Date: 2002
UK Chart: 98
7" (R6593):
"Which Of The Two Of Us Is Gonna Burn This House Down?"
"Stain Glass Shoes"

Stay Away From Me
Release Date: 2003
UK Chart: 52
7" (R6604):
"Stay Away From Me"
"The Sins Of A Family Fall On The Daughter"
CD:
"Stay Away From Me"
"The Sins Of A Family Fall On The Daughter"

I Live For Speed
Release Date: 2003
UK Chart: 60
7" (R6609):
"I Live For Speed"
"I Feel So Good"
CD:
"I Live For Speed"
"I Feel So Good"

References

External links
The Star Spangles' MySpace page
 The Independent 
Nypress.com
stereogum song 19
Popmatters 
Village Voice 
CMJ (Christian Music Journal)
Dallas Observer
site

Musical groups established in 2001
Punk rock groups from New York (state)
Capitol Records artists